Henry Sidney, 1st Earl of Romney (also spelt Sydney; March 1641 – 8 April 1704) was an English Whig politician, soldier and administrator. He is now best remembered as one of the Immortal Seven who drafted the Invitation to William of Orange, which led to the November 1688 Glorious Revolution and subsequent deposition of James II of England.

Personal details

Henry Sidney was born in Paris around March 1641, fourth surviving son of Robert Sidney, 2nd Earl of Leicester (1595–1677), and his wife Lady Dorothy Percy (died 1659). His brothers included Philip (1619–1698), who fought for Parliament during the Wars of the Three Kingdoms, and Algernon (1623–1683), a political theorist closely associated with John Locke who was executed in 1683 for his part in the Rye House Plot. Another brother, Robert (1626–1668), served in the army of the Dutch Republic, and was a close companion of the exiled Charles II of England, although he fell from favour shortly before his death.

His eldest sister Dorothy (1617–1684) married Henry Spencer, 1st Earl of Sunderland (1620–1643), killed fighting for the Royalists during the First English Civil War; her son, Robert Spencer, 2nd Earl of Sunderland (1641–1702), was born in Paris a few months after Henry and the two men were close friends for most of their lives. From December 1685 to October 1688, Sunderland was Lord President of the Council under James II of England. Another sister, Lucy (circa 1626-1685), married Sir John Pelham, 3rd Baronet (1623–1703), MP for Sussex for most of the period from 1654 to 1695. A Whig who supported the Glorious Revolution, two of his grandsons served as Prime Minister.

Although Sidney had an illegitimate son, Henry Worthley, he never married; on 8 April 1704, he died of smallpox at his house in London and was buried a few days later in St James's Church, Piccadilly. His titles became extinct.

Career
Sidney was brought up at Penshurst Place, the family home in Kent and spent much of the period from 1658 to 1664 travelling in Europe with his nephew and contemporary, the Earl of Sunderland. On his return, he held a number of positions at court and in 1667 was commissioned as captain in the Holland Regiment, commanded by his brother Robert. He carried out a number of minor diplomatic missions in the 1670s and received his first significant office in 1678 when Charles appointed him Master of the Robes.

In early 1678, England re-entered the Franco-Dutch War as an ally of the Dutch Republic and Sidney was given command of a new regiment raised to fight in it. Although the war ended before he saw active service, he became friends with William of Orange; with the support of Sunderland, then Secretary of State for the Northern Department, in June 1679 he was appointed Envoy to the United Provinces, a position he held with marked success until 1681.

In October 1679, he was also elected as MP for Bramber in what is commonly called the "Exclusion Bill Parliament". The central issue during this period was the attempt to exclude the Catholic Duke of York from the succession. Sidney was a "Williamite exclusionist", one of those who supported exclusion but preferred William of Orange, son of a Stuart mother and married to James' eldest daughter Mary, rather than Charles' illegitimate son, James Scott, 1st Duke of Monmouth. This ultimately led to his dismissal, although he was permitted to return to the Netherlands in 1682 and given command of one of the English regiments of the Dutch Anglo-Scots Brigade.

In 1683, Algernon Sidney was executed for his part in the Rye House Plot, an alleged conspiracy to assassinate Charles II along with his brother James, and place Monmouth on the throne. As William's wife Mary was then heir to the English throne, he provided troops to help suppress the June 1685 Monmouth Rebellion. Sidney was thus able to balance his obligations as a loyal subject with acting as an informal contact point between William and his English supporters, as well as Sunderland, whom James appointed Lord President of the Council in 1685. The situation changed in June 1688 with the birth of a male heir, James Francis Edward Stuart; the prospect of a Catholic dynasty led to the Invitation to William. Signed by the Immortal Seven, representatives from the key political constituencies whose support William needed to commit to an invasion, it was drafted by Sidney, later described as "the great wheel on which the Revolution rolled".

In August, he journeyed to The Hague and was appointed major general in the invasion force assembled by William that landed at Torbay on 5 November. In what became known as the Glorious Revolution, most of James' army changed sides and he escaped into exile in France on 23 December. Sidney was elected MP for Tamworth in the 1689 Convention Parliament that on 14 February made William and Mary co-monarchs in place of her father. On 4 April, he was created Baron Milton and Viscount Sydney, became a Privy Councillor and received a number of other offices, including Lord Lieutenant of Kent and Constable of Dover Castle.  

Sidney accompanied William in 1690 when he took personal charge of the war in Ireland; appointed colonel of the Foot Guards, he fought at the Boyne in July, as well as the sieges of Waterford and Limerick. Recalled to London in December 1690, he was appointed Secretary of State for the Northern Department, before returning to Ireland as Lord Lieutenant in March 1692. Although his tenure was marked by conflict with the Irish Parliament  and lasted less than a year, he retained William's confidence; in 1693, he was made Master-General of the Ordnance, then promoted Lieutenant-General and created Earl of Romney in 1694. 

At the same time, he purchased the office of Chief Ranger of Greenwich Park, allowing him to use the Queen's House as a personal residence. He undertook a series of improvements, one of which was to alter the course of the main road between Woolwich and Deptford, part of which is now called "Romney Road". He remained a close advisor to William and accompanied him to The Hague for the negotiations that led to the signing of the Second Grand Alliance in September 1701. However, when William died and Queen Anne came to the throne in March 1702, he lost most of his offices and retired from active political life; he died of smallpox at his house in London on 8 April 1704, and was buried a few days later at St James's Church, Piccadilly.

Legacy

Sidney's reputation has been subject to a variety of views; some contemporaries considered him lazy and superficial, while Tory satirist Jonathan Swift dismissed him as 'an idle, drunken, ignorant rake, without sense or honour'.  Other perspectives are more charitable and in general present him as "an individual with flaws, but also remarkable for his even temper, straight dealing, good judgement, and a knack for gaining the trust of others".

It has been suggested the use of the pheon, or broad arrow, on government property dates from Sidney's period as Master General of the Ordnance. However, the Oxford English Dictionary argues "this is not supported by the evidence", as the use of the device predates his association with the Board.

References

Sources
 
 
 
 
 
 
 
 
 
 
 * 
 

|-

|-

1641 births
1704 deaths
Earls in the Peerage of England
Peers of England created by William III
English generals
Grenadier Guards officers
Lord-Lieutenants of Kent
Lords Lieutenant of Ireland
Lords Warden of the Cinque Ports
Members of the Privy Council of England
People from Penshurst
Sidney, Henry
Sydney
Ambassadors of England to the Netherlands
English MPs 1679
English MPs 1689–1690
Grooms of the Stool
People of the Glorious Revolution